Timothy Anthony McDonnell (born December 23, 1937) is an American prelate of the Roman Catholic Church. McDonnell served as bishop of the Diocese of Springfield in Massachusetts from 2004 to 2014 and as an auxiliary bishop of the Archdiocese of New York from 2001 to 2004.

Biography

Early life and education
Timothy McDonnell was born on December 23, 1937, in New York City to John J. and Margaret (née Looney) McDonnell, both from County Cork, Ireland. The eldest of two children, he has a younger brother, John McDonnell, who is a member of the Marist Brothers and currently serves as vice-provincial of his order's United States Province. Their father was a dockworker for Standard Oil in Brooklyn and later owned a gas station in the Bronx.

Timothy McDonnell attended parochial schools in the Bronx, and was inspired by his great-uncle to pursue a vocation to the priesthood. He then studied at Cathedral College in Queens, New York, and St. Joseph's Seminary in Yonkers, New York, where he obtained a Bachelor of Philosophy degree in 1959.

Ordination and ministry
On June 1, 1963, McDonnell was ordained a priest for the Archdiocese of New York by Cardinal Francis Spellman at St. Patrick's Cathedral in Manhattan.

After his ordination, McDonnell served as an associate pastor at Our Lady of Perpetual Help Parish in Ardsley, New York, and as a teacher at Maria Regina High School in Hartsdale, New York until 1969. McDonnell earned a Master of Education in pastoral counseling degree from Iona College in New Rochelle, New York, in 1970.

From 1970 to 1977, McDonnell was assistant director of the archdiocesan Office for Christian and Family Development, while also serving as a chaplain at Cardinal McCloskey School and Home for Children in White Plains, New York. He was then named director of the Society for the Propagation of the Faith in 1977, vice-chancellor for the archdiocese in 1980, and monsignor by the Vatican in 1983.

From 1984 to 1990, McDonnell served as pastor of Holy Trinity Parish in Manhattan. He briefly served as episcopal vicar of West Manhattan (1989–1990). In 1990, he became chief operating officer of the archdiocesan Catholic Charities and was also assigned to help run Covenant House in Manhattan following the resignation of its president, Reverend Bruce Ritter.

In 1993, McDonnell became pastor of St. John and St. Mary Parish in Chappaqua, New York, serving there until 2002.  While in Chappaqua, he oversaw a major renovation construction project at the church.

Auxiliary Bishop of New York

On October 30, 2001, Pope John Paul II appointed McDonnell as auxiliary bishop of the Archdiocese of New York and titular bishop of Semina. He was consecrated on December 12, 2001, by Cardinal Edward Egan, with Bishops Henry J. Mansell and Robert Brucato serving as co-consecrators, at St. Patrick's Cathedral in Manhattan. McDonnell selected as his episcopal motto: "Love God and Love Neighbor."

In addition to his duties as an auxiliary bishop, McDonnell served as vicar general of the archdiocese from 2002 to 2004. In May 2003, McDonnell reported to the archdiocesan priests council on the reorganization and possible consolidation of parishes within the archdiocese.

Bishop of Springfield
On March 9, 2004, John Paul II named McDonnell as the eighth bishop of the Diocese of Springfield. He was installed on April 1, 2004, at St. Michael's Cathedral in Springfield.  McDonnell has presided over a number of historic church closings and sales in the diocese.

On May 13, 2004, McDonnell liquidated a fund designed to help priests accused of sexual misconduct.  The fund had been set up by then Bishop Thomas Dupré in late 2003.  The existence of the fund had provoked conflict between McDonnell and one of his parish priests, James Scahill.  Scahill had been withholding part of the parish collection to protest continued diocese support of Richard Lavigne, a priest convicted of child molestation in 1992.  During a heated exchange at a council meeting, McDonnell accused Scahill of calling him a "Vatican lackey".  When Scahill denied it, McDonnell said that he was worse than Lavigne and dismissed him from the meeting 

A few days after his installation, McDonnell had met with a mediator about settling several sexual abuse lawsuits against the diocese.  On July 23, 2004, the diocese announced a $7 million settlement with 46 victims of child sexual abuse, many of whom had been molested by Levigne. By September, 2004, McDonnell and Scahill had reconciled their differences and performed mass together at Scahill's church.  McDonnell apologized to Scahill during the service for his words at the meeting earlier that year.

On October 31, 2006, McDonnell signed a letter with the other Catholic bishops of Massachusetts urging support for a proposed constitutional amendment to ban same sex marriage.

Retirement
On June 19, 2014 Pope Francis accepted McDonnell's letter of resignation as bishop of the Diocese of Springfield.

See also
 

 Catholic Church hierarchy
 Catholic Church in the United States
 Historical list of the Catholic bishops of the United States
 List of Catholic bishops of the United States
 Lists of patriarchs, archbishops, and bishops

References

External links
 Roman Catholic Diocese of Springfield
 Biography of The Most Rev. Timothy A. McDonnell

Episcopal succession

1937 births
Living people
Roman Catholic bishops of Springfield in Massachusetts
People of the Roman Catholic Archdiocese of New York
Saint Joseph's Seminary (Dunwoodie) alumni
Iona University alumni
21st-century Roman Catholic bishops in the United States
People from the Bronx
People from Hartsdale, New York
People from White Plains, New York
People from Ardsley, New York
Religious leaders from New York (state)
Catholics from New York (state)